Ruth Tester (August 17, 1903 – March 21, 1993) was a singer and dancer in Broadway musicals of the 1920s and 1930s.

Biography
Tester was born on August 17, 1903.  She was married for 59 years to Fredrick Carothers.  In her later years, Tester and her husband, Carothers, lived in Wellesley Hills, Massachusetts.  Carothers worked as a sales executive, and predeceased Testor in 1990.  Tester sang "Sing Something Simple" in "The Garrick Gaieties" of 1930 at the Guild Theatre in New York City and performed with Rosalind Russell and Imogene Coca.  She also sang and danced in the short subject film, "Makers of Melody (1929)", with Allan Gould singing the Rodgers and Hart song "Manhattan", often called, "I'll Take Manhattan". Richard Rodgers and Lorenz Hart appeared in this short as themselves. Manhattan was Rodgers and Hart's first hit and started them as a team.  Tester died at the age of 89 in a nursing home in Weston, Massachusetts on March 21, 1993.

Broadway stage credits
The Gangs All Here Imperial Theatre (February 18, 1931 - March 9, 1931)... as Peggy
The Garrick Gaieties of 1930 Guild Theatre (October 16, 1930 for 10 performances), Ruth Tester... as herself
Second Little Show Royale Theatre (September 2, 1930 - October 1930)
The Garrick Gaieties of 1930 Guild Theatre (June 4, 1930), Ruth Tester... as herself
The Ramblers Lyric Theatre (September 20, 1826 - May 28, 1927)... as Jenny Wren
Bunk of 1926 Heckscher Theater and Broadhurst Theatre (February 16, 1926 - May 19, 1926)
A Lucky Break Cort Theater (August 11, 1925 - August 1925)... as Claudia
Lollipop Knickerbocker Theatre (January 21, 1924 - May 31, 1924)... in ensemble

Filmography
Makers of Melody (1929), Ruth Tester... as herself

External links

Ruth Tester singing the Rodgers and Hart song, "Manhattan" in the short "Makers of Melody" with Allan Gould https://www.youtube.com/watch?v=NPIgQdOoEV0
New York Times Obituatary   https://www.nytimes.com/1993/03/25/obituaries/ruth-tester-carothers-singer-89.html
Sing Something Simple  https://www.youtube.com/watch?v=wuqVk1S5uks

American female dancers
1903 births
1993 deaths
20th-century American singers
20th-century American women singers
20th-century American dancers